The Waters (stylized as The Water[s]) is the fourth mixtape by American rapper Mick Jenkins. It was released on August 12, 2014, by Cinematic Music Group.

Background
The Waters is a concept mixtape. Jenkins' lyrics are immersed in the symbolic meanings of water. The mixtape includes features by Pro Era member Joey Badass as well as The Mind, Noname, and Jean Deaux. Producers who contributed in the mixtape include Statik Selektah, Kirk Knight, OnGaud, Spacedtime, THEMpeople, THC, Dream Koala, DJ Dahi, High Klassfied, Da P, J Money, TJ Osinulu and Cam for J.U.S.T.I.C.E. League.

Critical reception

Nathan Stevens of PopMatters rated the mixtape a 7/10 saying "There's not really a bad song here, but next to monsters like "Jazz", "Martyrs", and "Jerome" some of the album feels like filler. When the album's main trio is composed of some of the best songs of the year, other tracks can't help but pale in comparison. Still, The Water(s) proves that Jenkins is as ambitious as he is talented. Saying that The Water(s) shows potential would be unfair. Jenkins has already arrived."

Steven Goldstein of HipHopDX gave the mixtape a positive review saying "The Water[s] is one of the most accomplished releases out of Chicago this year, but it's not sensitive to time or location. Rather, the 23-year-old Jenkins raps about longstanding issues that are both institutional and individual. He's keen to point out the bullshit that clouds our day-to-day, but more importantly, he readily admits when the solutions can't be found."

Michael Blair of XXL gave the mixtape a grand "XL", writing "The indisputable success that Mick has achieved in The Water[s], is not only confirmation that he is imperative to the progress of hip-hop within his specific region of the country, but most importantly, that he warrants recognition as a formidable opponent to some of hip-hop's most highly regarded MCs. Mick Jenkins' proverbial cup is currently filled with some of the purest water that the industry has to offer, and if you ask the fearless man who's holding it, he'll assure you that there is an eternal supply of it to come."

Track listing

Sample credits
 "Shipwrecked" contains a sample of "Supernatural", performed by KING.
 "THC" contains a sample of "Play", performed by iamamiwhoami.
 "Healer" contains a sample of "We Can't Be Friends", performed by Dream Koala.
 "Vibe" contains a sample of "The Sweetest Pain", performed by Dexter Wansel.
 "Jazz" contains a sample of "Toxic", performed by Yael Naim.
 "514" contains a sample of "Fog", performed by Nosaj Thing.
 "Martyrs" contains a sample of "Strange Fruit", performed by Carmen McRae.
 "Jerome" contains samples of "Testify", performed by Sounds of Blackness; and "Dead Wrong", performed by The Notorious B.I.G.

References

2014 mixtape albums
Albums produced by J.U.S.T.I.C.E. League
Albums produced by Statik Selektah
Albums produced by Kirk Knight